Met-Xaa dipeptidase (methionyl dipeptidase, dipeptidase M) is an enzyme. This enzyme catalyses the following chemical reaction

 Hydrolysis of Met!Xaa dipeptides

This Mn2+-activated Escherichia coli enzyme with thiol dependence

References

External links 
 

EC 3.4.13